Rajputana–Malwa Railway was a  (metre gauge) railway line which ran from Delhi to Ajmer and from Ajmer to Indore and Ahmedabad. It was earlier known as Rajputana State Railway until 1882 when it was renamed.

History 

It was opened on 18 August 1876. The railway was renamed as Rajputana–Malwa Railway when a new line from Ajmer to Khandwa via New Ujjain Junction, Indore Junction, Indore New Rajendra Nagar Terminus and Mhow was added to it. On 9 March 1885 Jodhpur was connected to this network from Marwar Junction with metre gauge track and later became part of the Jodhpur-Bikaner Railway. F-734, the first locomotive built in India, was built by the Ajmer workshop of the Rajputana Malwa Railway in 1895. This locomotive with outside connecting and side rods was used on Rajputana Malwa as well as Bombay, Baroda and Central India Railway systems.  The management of Rajputana-Malwa Railway was taken over by the Bombay, Baroda and Central India Railway (B.B.C.I.) in 1889 and it was absorbed into BBCI in 1900.

Conversion to broad gauge 
The railway lines were converted to  broad gauge in sections from 1994 till 2017.

References
 AJMER WORKSHOP
 Chronology of railways in India, Part 2 (1870 - 1899)

Metre gauge railways in India
Defunct railway companies of India
Rail transport in Rajasthan
Railway lines opened in 1876
History of Rajasthan
Rail transport in Madhya Pradesh
Transport in Indore
Transport in Ujjain
Transport in Ahmedabad
Transport in Ajmer
Transport in Delhi
Malwa